The Federal Polytechnic, Nasarawa, abbreviated FPN, is a  tertiary institution in Nasarawa, Nasarawa State, Nigeria commonly referred to as FedPolyNas or simply FPN. The school was established on 1 July 1983 by the Federal Government of Nigeria to foster technological development in the society. In 2019, the school matriculated over 3,681 students, 2,361 being National Diploma and 1,320 being Higher National Diploma students. The rector as of November 2020, Abdullahi Ahmed, revealed to National Information Technology Development Agency (NITDA) boss in Abuja, the desire of the institution of becoming a reference point in terms of adequate ICT infrastructure and standard training facilities and how much had been invested so far.

Organisation 
All basic lectures are held in English language.

Fees

Schools 
FedPolyNas is divided into six schools:

Associations 
Below is the list of all registered associations, clubs and societies as of 2011:
 Academic Staff Union of Polytechnics (ASUP)
 Abuja National Students' Union (ANSU)
 Apostolic Church Students Fellowship of Nigeria (ACSFN)
 Association of General Studies Department (AGSD)
 Benue State Students' Union (BESSU)
 Borno-Yobe Students Association (BYSA)
 Christ Ambassadors Students Out Reach (CASOR)
 Christ Apostolic Church Students Campus Fellowship (CACSCF)
 Community of Christian Students (CCS)
 Creative Arts Club
 Deeper Life Campus Fellowship (DLCF)
 Discovery Club
 Drama Club
 Estate Management Students Association (EMSA)
 Federal Road Safety Club (FRSC)
 Federal Union of Edo State Students (FUESS)
 Fellowship of Christian Students (FCS)
 Global Leadership Interlink (GLI)
 Gombe State Students Association (GSSA)
 Information Technology Club (ITC)
 Kaduna State Students Association (KADSSA)
 Kano State Students Association (KSSA)
 Kogi State Students Association (KOSSA)
 Mass Communication, Theatre and Dramatic Society (MCTDS)
 Muslim Students' Society of Nigeria (MSSN)
 Nasarawa State Students Association (NASSA)
 National Association of Accountancy Students (NAAS)
 National Association of Akwa Ibom Students (NAAIS)
 National Association of Anambra State Students (NAASS)
 National Association of Building Students (NABS)
 National Association of Business Administration and Management Students (NABAMS)
 National Association of Crime Management Students (NACMS)
 National Association of Cross River State Students (NACRSS)
 National Association of Delta State Students (NADSS)
 National Association of Electrical Engineering Students (NAEES)
 National Association of Katsina State Students (NAKASS)
 National Association of Kwara State Students (NAKSS)
 National Association of Marketing Students (NAMS)
 National Association of Mechanical Engineering Students (NAMES)
 National Association of Niger State Students (NANSS)
 National Association of Plateau State Students (NAPSS)
 National Association of Polytechnic Engineering Students (NAPES)
 National Association of Q. S. Students (NAQSS)
 National Association of Science and Technology Students (NASTES)
 National Association of Secretarial Students (NASS)
 National Association of Town Planning Students (NATPS)
 National Gamji Memorial Club (NGMC)
 National Society of Architectural Technology Students (NSATA)
 National Union of Rivers State Students (NURSA)
 Nigerian Federation of Catholic Students (NFCS)
 Ondo State Students' Association (OSSA)
 Osun State Progressive Students Union (OSPSU)
 Oyo State Students'Association (OYSSA)
 Rotaract Club
 Sokoto-Kebbi Students Association (SKSA)
 Students Discovery Club
 Students Safety Club (SSC)
 Students' Union Government (SUG)
 Taraba State Students Union (TSSU)
 The Cadet Force
 The Press Club
 Winners Campus Fellowship (WCF)
 Women Trafficking & Child Labour Eradication Foundation (WTCLEF)
 Zamfara State Students Association (ZSSA)

Funding
The school was one of the 19 federal and state own polytechnics to receive financial support from the Tertiary Education Trust Fund (TETFund) in July 2017. As reported by The Guardian, the institution got N43.5m out of a total of N847.4m.

Event hosting and infrastructure

Sports

The institution got the chance to improve on its sports infrastructure when it was selected to host the 19th Nigeria Polytechnic Games Association (NIPOGA) events that was held between April 26 to May 6, 2017, tagged "Nasarawa 2017", in which Lagos State Polytechnic (LASPOTECH) emerged overall winners. According to its rector as of then, Prof. Shettima Abdulkadir Saidu, the facilities realized included an indigenously made cauldron, mascot, the pavilion named after the then Nasarawa State governor, Umaru Tanko Al-Makura, plus the commissioning of a 1,500 capacity Multipurpose Hall, named after the Nigerian president, Muhammadu Buhari. In addition, the FPN FM 88.5 Radio station, which broadcast the entire NIPOGA activities was commissioned. The events were promoted by the A3 Foundation.

The school participated in the 19th National Board for Technical Education (NBTE)/Nigeria Polytechnics Senior Staff Games (NIPOSSGA) events, held April 21 - 28, 2018, in Enugu.

Events
In 2018, the school hosted the 91st National Executive Council (NEC) meeting of the Academic Staff Union of Polytechnics (ASUP).

Discipline 
In 2008, about 133 students from the previous academic session drawn from all the departments of the school were, according to its then rector, Pius Salami, during the matriculation ceremony for the 2007–2008 student set expelled for certificate forgery and examination malpractice related offences.

See also
 List of polytechnics in Nigeria

References

External links 

 
 FedPolyNas Portal

 
Federal_polytechnics_in_Nigeria
Nasarawa State